Arthur Claud Slater (17 August 1890 – 19 November 1972) was an Australian rules footballer who played with the Essendon Football Club. He was also listed with the Melbourne Football Club, but never played a game.

Born in Williamstown, Victoria, he was a clerk for the British Imperial Oil company, later to become Shell Oil Company, before joining the AIF in March 1915. He served at Gallipoli and on the Western Front, was wounded, promoted through the ranks and ended the war as a lieutenant. He rejoined Shell and by the 1930s he was the company's Australian Operations Manager.

He was the father of Professor "Harry" Henry Welton Slater  and Melbourne architect Phyllis Slater.

References

External links

1890 births
1972 deaths
Australian rules footballers from Melbourne
Essendon Football Club players
Australian military personnel of World War I
People from Williamstown, Victoria
Military personnel from Melbourne
Shell plc people
20th-century Australian businesspeople
Businesspeople from Melbourne